Fentonium bromide (INN) is an anticholinergic and antispasmodic atropine derivative. In the US its patent number is 3,356,682. It is sold by Sanofi-Aventis and Zambon.

References

Tropanes
Quaternary ammonium compounds
Bromides
Aromatic ketones
Primary alcohols
Carboxylate esters
Biphenyls
Muscarinic antagonists